Corbin Michael Allred (born May 25, 1979) is an American actor. He starred in the 2003 award-winning motion picture Saints and Soldiers and the 1997–1998 television series Teen Angel.

Career
Allred's acting career began when he was 12 years old after attending an open casting call in his home town of Midvale, Utah. He has appeared in multiple productions for Mormon cinema. Allred is a member of the Church of Jesus Christ of Latter-day Saints, and served a mission for the Church in Australia.

In addition to Saints and Soldiers and Teen Angel, Allred played the lead role in Josh Kirby... Time Warrior! and is known for his role in Robin Hood: Men in Tights. He appeared in the 1999 films Diamonds alongside Dan Aykroyd and Kirk Douglas and Anywhere but Here with Natalie Portman and Susan Sarandon. He played a lead role in The Saratov Approach, a 2013 film about the weeklong abduction of two LDS missionaries in Russia that occurred in 1998.

In television, Allred has had roles in an episode of CSI: Crime Scene Investigation, an episode of NCIS, and a couple episodes of Sabrina the Teenage Witch.

Filmography

Film

Television

References

External links

American male film actors
American male television actors
Latter Day Saints from California
Latter Day Saints from Utah
Male actors from Salt Lake City
1979 births
Living people